Lillian Crombie (born 1958) is an Aboriginal Australian actress and dancer, known for her work on stage, film and television.

Early life and education
Lillian Crombie was born in 1958. She is of the Pitjantjatjara/ Yankunytjatjara people of central Australia, but was taken from her parents at the age of seven and never saw them again. She grew up in a loving home with foster parents in  Port Pirie, South Australia.

She trained in classical ballet at the Port Pirie Ballet School, before winning a scholarship to Dance Concert Limited in Sydney, which started at the beginning of 1975, when she was 16. There she learnt and performed various cultural dances, such as the maypole dance, and in that year also did a dance and drama course at the National Black Theatre in Redfern. She then joined National Aboriginal and Islander Skills Development Association (NAISDA) as one of their  first intake of students in 1976, and joined the performance arm of the organisation, the Aboriginal Islander Dance Theatre (AIDT) soon afterwards.

Crombie then applied for and won a scholarship via Department of Employment, Education and Training (DEET) and the Australia Council to go to the Alvin Ailey American Dance Theater in New York City. She also trained at the National Institute of Dramatic Art (NIDA), after being invited by Keith Bain, and the Eora Centre. She learnt modern dance, jazz ballet and traditional Aboriginal and Torres Strait Islander dance.

Career
Crombie toured with AIDT on its first international tour to Nigeria, (FESTAC 77) in 1977, along with Wayne Nicol, Michael Leslie, Richard Talonga, and Roslyn Watson.

Working with Stephen Page, she had some fun doing mixed drag acts, and in the 1980s joined the Sydney Mardi Gras to support the gay community during the AIDS pandemic. Working with David Page, she performed at some fund-raising events for HIV/AIDS.

In 1988, she was one of a four-woman dance troupe who called themselves the African Dance Group and performed a show directed by Robyn Archer at The Space Theatre in the Adelaide Festival Centre for the Adelaide Festival of Arts, entitled AKWANSO (Fly South). The others in the group were Ghanaian-Australian Dorinda Hafner, African-American dancer and choreographer Aku Kadogo, and Jamaican Jigzie Campbell. Each woman tells her own story of racial prejudice, which is followed by a dance by all four women, choreographed by Mary Barnett of the Alvin Ailey American Dance Theater.

Having met film director Baz Luhrmann at NIDA in 1983, she applied for and won a role in his 2008 film Australia.

Other roles
Following the death of her brother, in 2015 Crombie founded The Lillian Crombie Foundation (TLCF), which supports people who need to travel for "Sorry Business" (for funerals, grieving and healing purposes). It provides financial and emotional support and culturally-appropriate respect and care. She says the spark was provided by the plight of a friend ten years earlier, who could not afford to travel home to Western Australia to attend the funeral of her mother, and no charities were able to help.

In October 2020 Crombie established a series of dance workshops for children in Port Pirie, in preparation for her planned establishment of the Lillian Crombie School of Dance and Drama. The workshops included tuition in classical ballet, hip hop, Aboriginal and Torres Strait Islander dance, and drama.

 she was intending to create a documentary film and book about her life.

Recognition
In 2019 Crombie shared the Equity Foundation's Lifetime Achievement Award with Ningali Lawford-Wolf. Wesley Enoch described her as "a pioneer of Australian Theatre who has paved the way for many Indigenous stories to be told".

Personal and family
Crombie is a survivor of the Stolen Generation, and the mother of actor Elaine Crombie.
 She has health issues and has to have kidney dialysis.

A 2019 short TV documentary in a series called Deadly Family Portraits, called Crombie Crew, focused on Lillian and her daughter Elaine.  the film is available on ABC iview.

Theatre
Crombie's theatre credits include many productions with Company B at the Belvoir Street Theatre (Conversations with The Dead, Black Mary and the Sydney Theatre Company, and she featured in Bangarra Dance Theatre's Clan and Riverside's Rainbow’s End.

Film and TV
Crombie's film and television credits include:
 Ring of Scorpio (1990). TV
 Deadly (1991). Sally
 Jindalee Lady (1992)
 Double Trouble (2008). TV Series, Milly (13 episodes)
 The Secret Life of Us (2003)
 Lucky Miles (2007). Evie
 Days Like These (2007 telemovie). Mum
 Australia (2008). Bandy Legs

References

External links

 

Living people
21st-century Australian actresses
Indigenous Australian actresses
1958 births
20th-century Australian actresses
Indigenous Australian dancers